Omar Enrique Alfanno Velásquez, better known as Omar Alfanno, is a Panamanian singer-songwriter of Latin music who is most active in the salsa and merengue genres.

Reuters noted him as "one of Latin music's premiere songwriters and the man behind countless hits".

He has composed for musicians like Tony Vega, Luis Enrique, Melina Leon, Jerry Rivera, Victor Manuelle, Gilberto Santa Rosa, and Marc Anthony. His most successful song, "A Puro Dolor" performed by the Son by Four, reached the Billboard Hot 100.  The song was awarded a Lo Nuestro Award, a Billboard Music Award, and a Latin Grammy Award nomination in 2000. His song  "Amores Como el Nuestro" — written for Jerry Rivera — was sampled by Wyclef Jean in the 2004 song "Dance Like This" which was later used for the 2006 Shakira hit "Hips Don't Lie". "Amores Como el Nuestro" was also sampled by Lord Tariq and Peter Gunz in the 1998 song "Deja Vu (Uptown Baby)".

In April 2013, he performed with many of his collaborators at a concert in Panama.

Life 
Alfanno was born January 4, 1957, in Santiago de Veraguas, Panama, and lives in Panama City today. He studied to be a dental surgeon in Mexico but his true passion was music. Once he graduated, he pursued a career as a singer making his professional debut in 1987 with the prestigious company RCA Records. His first album in the salsa genre was titled Cosas de Barrio. The next year he moved to Puerto Rico where he made the productions Joe de Barrio and Cuerpos al Calor. In 1990, he signed a contract with CBS, where he recorded En Torno Al Amor, his fourth and last album in his short but blooming career as a singer. His career as a composer started right there in Puerto Rico where artists such as Willie Colon, Gilberto Santa Rosa, Tony Vega, Luis Enrique, and Jerry Rivera recorded songs by Alfanno which marked his career as a composer. He moved to Miami in 1993 where he decided to internationalize his music. A year later, he worked with Marc Anthony, where he recorded three songs for the album Todo A Su Tiempo. After that, his career took off and he composed many hit songs. He also worked with Víctor Manuelle. Alfanno's success is credited with 16 gold records, 39 platinum discs which includes 9 double platinum, 4 triple platinum, 1 quadruple platinum and 3 quintuple platinum. He continues to compose with many other artists and continues to win awards that recognize his huge talent and success as a composer. Today, he is married to Carmen Alfanno and they have three children: Giancarlo, Gianna and Giovanna.

Discography
Cosas de Barrio (1987)
Cuerpos al Calor (1988)
En Torno al Amor (1991)
Joe de Barrio

Awards and nominations

American Society of Composers, Authors and Publishers Awards
Alfanno has won the following ASCAP awards.

|-
|rowspan="3" scope="row"| 1994
|scope="row"| Himself
|Songwriters of the Year
| 
|-
|scope="row"| "Que Hay de Malo"
|rowspan="2" scope="row"| Tropical Songs
| 
|-
|scope="row"| "Sin Voluntad"
| 
|-
|rowspan="3" scope="row"| 1995
|scope="row"| Himself
|Songwriter of the Year - Tropical
| 
|-
|scope="row"| "Que Hay de Malo"
|rowspan="4" scope="row"| Tropical Songs
| 
|-
|scope="row"| "Ella Es"
| 
|-
|rowspan="2" scope="row"| 1996
|scope="row"| "Te Conozco Bien"
| 
|-
|scope="row"| "Si Tú Supieras"
| 
|-
|rowspan="2" scope="row"| 2000
|scope="row"| "Qué Habría Sido de Mi"
|rowspan="2" scope="row"| Salsa Songs
| 
|-
|scope="row"| "No Sabes Como Duele"
| 
|-
|rowspan="8" scope="row"| 2001
|scope="row"| Himself
|Composer of the Year
| 
|-
|rowspan="2" |"A Puro Dolor"
|Song of the Year
| 
|-
|Pop/Balada Song of the Year
| 
|-
|rowspan="2" |"Que Alguien Me Diga"
|Salsa Song of the Year
| 
|-
|Pop/Balada Songs
| 
|-
|scope="row"| "Si la Ves"
|Salsa Songs
| 
|-
|rowspan="2" |"Cuando Una Mujer"
|Pop/Balada Songs
| 
|-
|Merengue Song of the Year
| 
|-
|rowspan="5" scope="row"| 2002
|scope="row"| Himself
|Composers of the Year
| 
|-
|"Me Da lo Mismo"
|rowspan="2" |Salsa Songs
| 
|-
|rowspan="2" |"Pueden Decir"
| 
|-
|rowspan="2" |Pop/Balada Songs
| 
|-
|"Cuando Seas Mía (Miss Me So Bad)"
| 
|-
| 2003
|rowspan="2"| "En Nombre de los Dos"
|rowspan="2"|  Tropical Songs
| 
|-
| 2004
| 
|-
| 2007
|"Hips Don't Lie"
| Pop/Ballad Songs
| 
|-
| 2009
|"No Te Vayas"
| Tropical Songs
| 
|-

Billboard Latin Music Awards
Alfanno has received the following Billboard Latin Music Awards and nominations.

|-
| 1999
| Himself
|Songwriter of the Year
| 
|-
| 2002
|Himself
| Songwriter of the Year
| 
|-
|}

Latin Grammy Awards
Alfanno has received the following Latin Grammy nominations.

|-
|scope="row"| 2000
|scope="row"| "A Puro Dolor"
|rowspan="2" scope="row"| Best Tropical Song
| 
|-
|scope="row"| 2002
|scope="row"| "Pueden Decir"
| 
|-
|scope="row"| 2016
|scope="row"| "Vine A Buscarte" 
| Best Tropical Song
|

References

External links 
 allmusic.com

1957 births
Panamanian songwriters
Living people
21st-century Panamanian male singers
21st-century Panamanian singers
Salsa musicians
People from Santiago District, Veraguas
Latin music songwriters
20th-century Panamanian male singers
20th-century Panamanian singers